Aan Paavam is a 1985 Indian Tamil-language romantic comedy film written and directed by Pandiarajan. It was his second directorial venture and first as actor. The film also stars Pandiyan, Revathi and Seetha. The film was released on 7 December 1985, and became a box office success. It was remade into Telugu as Naku Pellam Kavali (1987), in Kannada as Rama Krishna and in Marathi as Chal Lavkar.

Plot 

Periya Pandi (Pandiyan) and Chinna Pandi (Pandiarajan) are two notorious sons of the  village cinema theatre owner Ramasamy (V. K. Ramasamy). Periya Pandi goes to a neighbouring village to see a girl as arranged by his father towards his marriage and ends up in the wrong house. Coincidentally, those in the wrong house are also expecting a man to see their daughter on the same time and the same day. Contrary to real-time arranged marriages, Periya Pandi goes to see the girl totally un-aided by parents, relatives and friends. Nevertheless, he takes a liking to the girl, Seetha (Seetha), and decides to marry her. Seetha likes Periya Pandi and decides to accept the proposal. Meanwhile, Seetha's marriage broker shows up and clarifies that Periya Pandi was supposed to have gone to see some other girl but ended up in the wrong house. Hearing this, Periya Pandi, Seetha and Seetha's parents seem disappointed. Ramasamy fixes dates for his marriage to the girl originally chosen for him — Revathi (Revathi), a school teacher's daughter. Periya Pandi's adamance to marry Seetha causes a strange turn of events. Chinna Pandi finally marries Revathi, while Periya Pandi ties the knot with his love Seetha.

Cast 
 Pandiyan as Periya Pandi
 Pandiarajan as Chinna Pandi
 Revathi as Revathi
 Seetha as Seetha
 V. K. Ramasamy as Ramasamy
 Meesai Murugesan as Murugesan
 Poornam Viswanathan as Viswanathan Vathiyar
 Janagaraj as Kanagaraj
 Usilai Mani as Kanagaraj's restaurant cook
 Kollangudi Karuppayi as Pandi's grandmother
 Ramesh Khanna as Marriage Broker (Cameo) 
 Omakuchi Narasimhan as Parotta Master 
 Pasi Narayanan as Cheating Customer
 Nellai Siva as Villager
 Super Subburayan as Super, a fighter 
 Sridhar as Subakaran Radio Mecanic 
 Khaja Sharif as  Cloth Shop Boy
Krishnamurthy as Theatre Name Change Officer

Production 
Aan Paavam was Pandiarajan's second film as director and his debut film as an actor. Seetha who was studying in the 12th grade at that time was selected to play the lead actress after director saw her in a video at a marriage.

Soundtrack 
The music was composed by Ilaiyaraaja. The song "Kadhal Kasakkudayya" is based on Shanmukhapriya raga, and "Kuyile Kuyile" is based on Madhyamavati.

Reception
Jayamanmadhan of Kalki called the film's screenplay, dialogues and Janagaraj as plus points while praising Pandiarajan's acting as natural and added debutant Seetha has only little bit of camera fear, Pandiyan has managed his acting and the scenes involving Revathi evoke laughter.

Legacy 
The film was included by Behindwoods in their list "of All Time Top Ten comedy movies".

References

Bibliography

External links 
 

1980s Tamil-language films
1985 romantic comedy films
1985 films
Films scored by Ilaiyaraaja
Indian romantic comedy films
Tamil films remade in other languages